"I Go Blind" is a song by Canadian alternative rock group 54-40. The song was released in Canada as the second single from the band's 1986 self-titled album, 54-40. It has since become one of the band's most popular songs.

Hootie & the Blowfish cover
The song was recorded by American band Hootie & the Blowfish and originally released as a b-side on the band's "Hold My Hand" single. The cover was later released on the soundtrack of the TV series Friends. The cover became a radio hit in 1996, peaking at  No. 2 on the Adult Top 40 chart and at No. 22 on Billboard's Adult Contemporary chart. The Hootie version also charted on Canada's RPM Singles Chart, peaking at No. 13.

The song was featured on the band's compilation albums;  2000's Scattered, Smothered and Covered and 2003's The Best of Hootie & the Blowfish: 1993–2003.

Weekly charts

Year-end charts

References

External links

1986 singles
54-40 songs
Hootie & the Blowfish songs
1986 songs
1996 singles
Atlantic Records singles
Songs written by Darryl Neudorf
Friends (1994 TV series)